Burdekin may refer to:

People
 Burdekin (surname)

Places
 Shire of Burdekin, Queensland, Australia
 Electoral district of Burdekin, Queensland, Australia; of the Queensland legislature
 Townsville-Burdekin School District, Burdekin Shire, Queensland, Australia
 Burdekin River, Queensland, Australia; a river
 Burdekin Valley, Queensland, Australia; a river valley containing the Burdekin River
 Burdekin Falls, Queensland, Australia; an uncontrolled weir spillover falls on the eponymous river at the Burdekin Dam
 Burdekin Gap, Queensland, Australia; a biogeographic divide

Facilities and structures
 Burdekin Dam, Queensland, Australia; a dam on the eponymous river
 Burdekin Bridge, Queensland, Australia; a road bridge over the eponymous river
 Burdekin River Rail Bridge, Queensland, Australia; a heritage-listed bridge over the eponymous river
 Burdekin Catholic High School, Ayr, Queensland, Australia

Other uses
 , an Australian navy ship name
 , a WWII-era River-class frigate
 Burdekin plum (Pleiogynium timoriense), a fruit tree
 Burdekin duck (Radjah radjah), a shelduck

See also

 
 
 Burdekin River Pumping Station, Breddan, Charters Towers Region, Queensland, Australia; a pumping station on the eponymous river and heritage listed building
 Burdekin Shire Council Chambers, Ayr, Queensland, Australia; a heritage-listed building
 Lower Burdekin languages, Australian Aboriginal languages found along the Burdekin River